Ivor Grosvenor Guest, 2nd Viscount Wimborne,  (21 February 1903 – 7 January 1967) was a British politician.

Early life
Ivor Grosvenor Wimborne was born on 21 February 1903 and was the son of Ivor Guest, 1st Viscount Wimborne (1873–1939), and his wife the Hon. Alice Katherine Sibell (died 1948). His maternal grandfather was Robert Grosvenor, 2nd Baron Ebury (1834–1918). He was educated at Eton and Trinity College, Cambridge.

Career
After Cambridge, he served with the Royal Tank Corps (TA), achieving the rank of lieutenant.

From 1935 to 1939, he was National Member of Parliament (MP) for Brecon and Radnor. In the latter year he succeeded his father in the viscountcy and entered the House of Lords.

Personal life
Lord Wimborne married Lady Mabel Edith, daughter of Giles Fox-Strangways, 6th Earl of Ilchester (1874–1959), in 1938. William Walton composed "Set me as a seal upon thine heart" for the wedding.

He died in January 1967, aged 63, and was succeeded in his title by his son Ivor Fox-Strangways Guest (1939–1993).

References

External links

 
"KENSINGTON WEDDING", British Pathe Ltd

1903 births
1967 deaths
Viscounts in the Peerage of the United Kingdom
People educated at Eton College
Alumni of Trinity College, Cambridge
Royal Tank Regiment officers
Guest, Ivor
Guest, Ivor
UK MPs who inherited peerages
Ivor
Members of the Privy Council of the United Kingdom
Officers of the Order of the British Empire